Collective Phase One is a collaboration of artists and media professionals behind films such as I.D.,Njan Steve Lopez, Kismath, Aabhaasam, Kammatipaadam, Eeda, Run Kalyani and the upcoming Thuramukham. Collective is also involved in activities such as organic farming, theatre & music productions, acting workshops, disaster relief and rehabilitation.

References

Marketing is the main challenge: Rajeev Ravi 
COLLECTIVE PHASE ONE 
Rajeev Ravi to produce Shane Nigam's next 
National award-winning editor Ajithkumar turns director with 'Eeda' - First look poster

External links
 

Film organisations in India
Organizations established in 2011